James S. Blair (born c. 1910) was a Scottish footballer who played as a right half for Third Lanark in the first and second tiers of the Scottish Football League during the 1930s.

He won the Scottish Division Two title on two occasions (1930–31 and 1934–35) and played in the 1936 Scottish Cup Final which Thirds lost 1–0 to Rangers. A short time prior to the outbreak of World War II, Blair was selected to play for the Scottish Football League XI in two matches. In 1944 he joined St Mirren, but only appeared for the club in unofficial wartime competitions before retiring in 1946. He later managed Third Lanark between 1954 and 1955, without much success.

References

Year of birth unknown
Year of death unknown
Association football wing halves
Scottish Junior Football Association players
Scottish Football League players
Scottish Football League managers
Scottish footballers
Scottish football managers
Royal Albert F.C. players
Third Lanark A.C. players
Clyde F.C. wartime guest players
St Mirren F.C. players
Third Lanark A.C. managers
Scottish Football League representative players